Vladimir Pulnikov (born 6 June 1965 in Kiev) is a Ukrainian former road racing cyclist.

Career
He debuted in the amateur categories for Soviet Union. As a professional, his best results include a 4th place overall in the 1990 Giro d'Italia, a 10th overall place at the Tour de France in 1993 and 1994, and a second place overall at the 1994 Tour de Suisse and the stage victory in the Giro. He also competed in the men's individual road race at the 1996 Summer Olympics.

Poulnikov retired from professional cycling in 1998.

Major results

1985
 1st Stage 6 GP Tell
1986
 2nd Overall Course de la Paix
1987
 3rd Overall Okolo Slovenska
1988
 2nd Overall Course de la Paix
 2nd Overall Giro Ciclistico d'Italia
1989
Giro d'Italia
1st Young rider classification 
1st Stage 9
 1st Overall Cronostaffetta (TTT)
 3rd Memorial Gastone Nencini
1990
 2nd Overall Tour of Belgium
 4th Overall Giro d'Italia
1st Young rider classification 
1991
 7th Tre Valli Varesine
1992
 1st Overall Cronostaffetta (TTT)
 1st  Road race, National Road Championships
 1st Stage 4 Vuelta Ciclista al Pais Vasco
 1st Stage 5 Clásico RCN
 3rd Giro del Lazio
1993
 7th Overall Giro d'Italia
 9th Overall Vuelta Ciclista al Pais Vasco
 10th Overall Giro del Trentino
 10th Overall Tour de France
 10th Subida a Urkiola
1994
 1st Giro del Friuli
 1st Stage 20 Giro d'Italia
 2nd Overall Tour de Suisse
 10th Overall Tour de France
1996
 4th Overall Route du Sud
1997
 3rd Giro di Toscana

Grand Tour general classification results timeline

References

External links

1965 births
Living people
Sportspeople from Kyiv
Ukrainian male cyclists
Soviet male cyclists
Ukrainian Giro d'Italia stage winners
Olympic cyclists of Ukraine
Cyclists at the 1996 Summer Olympics
National University of Ukraine on Physical Education and Sport alumni
21st-century Ukrainian people